A stabbing is penetration or rough contact with a sharp or pointed object at close range. Stab connotes purposeful action, as by an assassin or murderer, but it is also possible to accidentally stab oneself or others. Stabbing differs from slashing or cutting in that the motion of the object used in a stabbing generally moves perpendicular to and directly into the victim's body, rather than being drawn across it.

Stabbings today are common among gangs and in prisons because knives are cheap, easy to acquire (or manufacture), easily concealable and relatively effective. In 2013, about 8 million stabbings occurred.

History

Stabbings have been common throughout human history and were the means used to assassinate a number of distinguished historical figures, such as Second Caliph Umar and Roman dictator Julius Caesar and emperor Caligula.

In Japan, the historical practice of stabbing oneself deliberately in ritual suicide is known as seppuku (more colloquially hara-kiri, literally "belly-cutting" since it involves cutting open the abdomen). The ritual is highly codified, and the person committing suicide is assisted by a "second" who is entrusted to decapitate him cleanly (and thus expedite death and prevent an undignified spectacle) once he has made the abdominal wound.

Mechanism
The human skin has a somewhat elastic property as a self-defense; when the human body is stabbed by a thin object such as a small kitchen knife, the skin often closes tightly around the object and closes again if the object is removed, which can trap some blood within the body. It has thus been speculated that the fuller, an elongated concave depression in a metal blade, functions to let blood out of the body in order to cause more damage. This misconception has led to fullers becoming widely known as "blood grooves". The fuller is actually a structural reinforcement of the blade similar in design to a metal I-beam used in construction. However, internal bleeding is just as dangerous as external bleeding; if enough blood vessels are severed to cause serious injury, the skin's elasticity will do nothing to prevent blood from exiting the circulatory system and accumulating uselessly in other parts of the body.

Death from stabbing is caused by shock, severe blood loss, infection, or loss of function of an essential organ such as the heart and/or lungs.

Medical treatment

Although previously a victim of abdominal stabbing would be subject to exploratory surgery laparotomy, it is now considered safe not to operate if the patient is stable.  In that case, they should be observed for signs of decompensation indicating a serious injury.  If the patient initially presents stabbing injuries and is unstable, then laparotomy should be initiated to discover and rectify any internal injury.

Autopsy examination
When someone who has sustained a stab wound dies, the body is autopsied and the wound is inspected by a forensic pathologist. Such examination can yield valuable information about the weapon used to produce the injury. From the external appearance and internal findings, the pathologist will usually be able to offer opinion about the dimensions of the weapon including the width and minimum possible length of the blade. It is possible to determine whether the weapon was single edged or double edged.

Sometimes factors like the taper of the blade and movement of knife in the wound can also be determined. Bruises or abrasions may give information about the guard.

See also
 Stabbing as a terrorist tactic
 Wound
 Impalement

References

External links

Injuries
Violence
 
Attacks by method
Causes of death
Murder